Casey Hayward Jr. (born September 9, 1989) is an American football cornerback for the Atlanta Falcons of the National Football League (NFL). He played college football at Vanderbilt. Hayward was drafted by the Green Bay Packers in the second round of the 2012 NFL Draft and played for the San Diego / Los Angeles Chargers for five seasons.

High school career
Hayward attended Perry High School, where he was a three-sport star in football, basketball and track. In football, he was a three-year starter at quarterback and also played several games at cornerback. As a senior, he led his team to the state quarterfinals by passing for 1,300 yards and 18 touchdowns as well as rushing for 1,284 yards and another 18 touchdowns. He also had four interceptions, three of which he returned for touchdowns. His performance had him named the Region 4-AAA Player of the Year. He was also named an All-State defensive back and an All-middle Georgia player. Hayward was also a member of the team's leadership council and a starting guard in basketball.

As an outstanding track & field athlete, Hayward excelled in sprints and jumps. At the 2008 Patriot Invitational, he earned a second-place finish in the triple jump event, posting a career-best leap of 13.93 meters (45 ft, 6 in), while also placing twelfth in the 100-meter dash, with a time of 11.48 seconds. He recorded a personal-best leap of 6.83 meters (22 ft, 3 in) in the long jump at the Harmon Invitational, where he took gold. He also ran a PR of 22.75 seconds in the 200-meter dash. In addition, he ran the 40-yard dash in 4.43 seconds, bench-pressed 255 pounds, squatted 400 pounds and had a 33-inch vertical.

Coming out of high school, Hayward was measured to be 6 ft. 1 in. and 185 pounds.  He received very few scholarship offers from division schools, which he attributed to being "strictly a quarterback". He was scouted by Georgia Tech, Louisville, Middle Tennessee State, North Carolina, Southern Miss, and Troy.

College career
Hayward ultimately chose to attend Vanderbilt University because of the school's academic ranking and the fact that the school is a member of the Southeastern Conference. He immediately played during his freshman year and made his permanent move to cornerback as a Nickelback and also on special teams.

In 2009, he was promoted to the starting role and played in every game, although he did miss most of two games due to injury. He was named the defensive player of the week against LSU after contributing 13 tackles (eight solo) with 4 for a loss. He was also named the team's most valuable defensive back.

Hayward continued to make an impact going into 2010 and started every game of the season. He had six interceptions, 70 tackles (59 solo), and 17 passes defended. He ranked first in the SEC and 3rd in the NCAA for passes defended. His performance earned him a spot on the second-team All-SEC as a defensive back by the coaches and media.

During his final season as a Vanderbilt Commodore, Hayward tied the career record for interceptions at 15 (also held by Leonard Coleman). He also made 62 tackles, and had seven interceptions, the third highest single season total by a Vanderbilt player. He was named a mid-season All-American by Sports Illustrated. At the end of the season, Hayward was named a second-team All-American by the Walter Camp Foundation, becoming the first Vanderbilt All-American in four years.

Professional career
On January 9, 2012, it was announced that Hayward had accepted his invitation to play in the 2012 Senior Bowl. On January 28, 2012, he made a pass deflection and intercepted a pass by Michigan State quarterback Kirk Cousins as part of Washington Redskins' head coach Mike Shanahan's South team that lost 23–13 to the North. Hayward was one of 59 collegiate defensive backs to attend the NFL Scouting Combine in Indianapolis, Indiana. He completed all of the combine drills, finishing tied for tenth in the bench press among his position group and 25th in the 40-yard dash. On March 23, 2012, Hayward attended Vanderbilt's pro day, but opted to stand on his combine numbers and only performed positional drills. Scouts praised his intelligence and instincts as well as his ability to recognize routes. They also stated that he was a good tackler with good footwork and durability. At the conclusion of the pre-draft process, Hayward was projected to be a second or third round pick by NFL draft experts and analysts. He was ranked the fourth best cornerback prospect by NFL analyst Mike Mayock, was ranked the ninth best cornerback by NFLDraftScout.com, and was ranked the 12th best cornerback by NFL analyst Gil Brandt.

Green Bay Packers

2012
The Green Bay Packers selected Hayward in the second round (62nd overall) of the 2012 NFL Draft. He was the fifth cornerback selected in 2012 and Vanderbilt's highest defensive back drafted since Fred Vinson in 1999. 

On May 11, 2012, the Green Bay Packers signed Hayward to a four-year, $3.30 million contract that includes $1.03 million guaranteed and a $847,208 signing bonus.

Hayward entered training camp competing against Jarrett Bush, Sam Shields, and Davon House for the vacant starting cornerback spot after veteran Charles Woodson was moved to strong safety to replace Nick Collins, who was released due to health concerns. Head coach Mike McCarthy named Hayward the third cornerback on the Packers' depth chart, behind Sam Shields and Tramon Williams.

He made his professional regular season debut in the Green Bay Packers' season-opener against the San Francisco 49ers and recorded one tackle in their 30–23 loss. On October 7, 2012, Hayward recorded two combined tackles, broke up a pass, and made his first career interception during the Packers' 30–27 loss to the Indianapolis Colts. He intercepted a pass attempt by Andrew Luck that was originally intended for Reggie Wayne to seal the victory in the fourth quarter. The following week, Hayward broke up three passes and intercepted two passes from Matt Schaub and T. J. Yates during the Packers' 42–24 victory at the Houston Texans. In Week 7, Hayward earned his first career start after Sam Shields was unable to play following a shin and knee injury. Hayward went on to record three solo tackles, a pass deflection, and an interception in a 30–20 victory at the St. Louis Rams. During the month of October 2012, he won the NFL defensive Rookie of the Month, having intercepted four passes three games. He finished third for NFL Defensive Rookie of the Year and was named to the NFL All-Joes team. 

In Week 8, Hayward recorded a season-high eight combined tackles in the Packers' 24–15 victory over the Jacksonville Jaguars.

The Green Bay Packers finished first in the NFC North with an 11–5 record and received a playoff berth. On January 5, 2013, Hayward played in his first career playoff game and collected four solo tackles in the 24–10 win against the Minnesota Vikings in the NFC Wildcard game. The Packers were defeated 45–31 by the San Francisco 49ers the following game. Hayward earned the highest overall grade of any slot corner ever graded by Pro Football Focus.

2013
Defensive coordinator Dom Capers and cornerbacks coach Joe Whitt Jr. held an open competition to name the starting cornerbacks for the regular season. Davon House, Tramon Williams, Sam Shields, and Hayward all competed for the starting roles. He fell behind in training camp following a hamstring injury that sidelined him for two weeks. Head coach Mike McCarthy named Hayward the third cornerback behind Williams and Shields to begin the regular season.

On August 23, 2013, Hayward returned for the third preseason game and recorded a tackle, a pass deflection, and made an interception before leaving the 17–10 loss to the Seattle Seahawks after aggravating his hamstring injury. He missed the last preseason game and first six regular season games (Weeks 1–6) with a hamstring injury. He returned in Week 8 and recorded a tackle in the Packers' 44–31 victory at the Minnesota Vikings. The following week, Hayward collected a season-high seven combined tackles in a 27–20 loss to the Chicago Bears. On November 23, 2013, the Green Bay Packers placed Hayward on injured reserve for the remainder of the season. He finished the  season with eight combined tackles (five solo) in three games and one start.

2014
He was named the third cornerback on the depth chart behind Sam Shields and Tramon Williams.

On October 26, 2014, Hayward recorded a season-high six combined tackles during a 44–23 loss at the New Orleans Saints. On November 9, 2014, he collected three solo tackles, a pass deflection, and returned an interception for an 82-yard touchdown as the Packers routed the Chicago Bears 54–14. It marked the first touchdown of Hayward's career. He finished the 2014 season with 42 combined tackles (33 solo), seven pass deflections, and 3 interceptions in 16 games and one start.

2015
Hayward entered training camp in 2015 slated as the starting cornerback opposite Sam Shields after Tramon Williams and Davon House departed during free agency. Head coach Mike McCarthy named Hayward and Shields the starting cornerback, ahead of rookies Damarious Randall and Quinten Rollins. On November 1, 2015, Hayward recorded a season-high seven combined tackles and three pass deflections during a 29–10 loss at the Denver Broncos. Hayward finished the  season with a career-high 65 combined tackles (56 solo) and seven pass deflections in 16 games and 11 starts. The Green Bay Packers finished the season with a 10–6 record and second in their division. On January 10, 2016, Hayward started his first career playoff game and collected seven combined tackles and a pass deflection in a 35–18 win at the Washington Redskins. They were eliminated after being defeated by the Arizona Cardinals in the NFC Divisional round.

He played outside corner during the majority of the season, but also played nickelback when Damarious Randall was used on the outside with Shields. Hayward led all Packers' cornerbacks in tackles and with 908 snaps on defense.

2016
Hayward became an unrestricted free agent for the first time in his career after the Green Bay Packers decided not to offer him a new contract despite a career-high number of tackles and starts in 2015. The decision surprised Hayward and Aaron Rodgers but was considered reasonable by members of Packers media coverage. He received interest from a few teams, including the San Francisco 49ers, Arizona Cardinals, Dallas Cowboys,
and San Diego Chargers.

San Diego / Los Angeles Chargers

2016 
On March 13, 2016, the San Diego Chargers signed Hayward to a three-year, $15.30 million contract that includes $6.80 million guaranteed and a signing bonus of $2.50 million.

Throughout training camp, Hayward competed for the job as the starting outside cornerback against Brandon Flowers. Head coach Mike McCoy named Hayward the starting nickelback to begin the regular season. He was also named the third cornerback on the depth chart, behind Jason Verrett and Brandon Flowers.

He started the San Diego Chargers' season-opener and made his Chargers' regular season debut at the Kansas City Chiefs. He recorded four combined tackles and defended two passes in the Chargers' 33–27 loss. The next week, Hayward collected four solo tackles, two pass break ups, and intercepted Jacksonville Jaguars' quarterback Blake Bortles twice in their 38–14 victory. In Week 5, Hayward collected a season-high eight solo tackles in San Diego's 34–31 loss at the Oakland Raiders. On October 30, 2016, he recorded three combined tackles, deflected three passes, and returned an interception for a 24-yard touchdown in a 27–19 loss at the Denver Broncos. On December 20, 2016, he was named to his first Pro Bowl. Hayward finished the  season with 58 combined tackles (51 solo), 20 pass deflections, seven interceptions, and a touchdown in 16 games and 14 starts. He finished first in the league with seven interceptions and second with 20 passes defensed and was named second-team All-Pro. He was also ranked 64th on the NFL Top 100 Players of 2017. The San Diego Chargers finished last in the AFC West with a 5–11 record and head coach Mike McCoy was fired. The team also relocated to Los Angeles during the off season.

2017
Former Buffalo Bills' offensive coordinator Anthony Lynn was hired as the Chargers' new head coach. Hayward entered camp as the de facto starting cornerback after Brandon Flowers was released. Head coach Anthony Lynn officially named Hayward and Jason Verrett the starting cornerbacks to start the regular season.

Hayward started the Los Angeles Chargers' season-opener against the Denver Broncos on Monday Night Football and recorded four combined tackles, a pass break up, and fumble recovery during their 24–21 loss. During the third quarter, Hayward recovered a fumble by Jamaal Charles after it was forced by Chargers' linebacker Korey Toomer. The following week, Hayward collected a season-high five combined tackles in the Chargers' 19–17 loss to the Miami Dolphins. On November 19, 2017, he made four solo tackles, three pass deflections, and intercepted Nathan Peterman twice as the Chargers routed the Buffalo Bills 54–24. On December 19, 2017, Hayward was named to his second Pro Bowl. He finished the  season with a total of 40 combined tackles (33 solo), a career-high 22 pass break ups, and four interceptions in 16 games and 16 starts. Pro Football Focus gave Hayward an overall grade of 96.4. His overall grade was first among all qualifying cornerbacks for 2017 and PFF also voted him the top coverage defender of the season. He was ranked 59th by his fellow players on the NFL Top 100 Players of 2018.

2018
On March 11, 2018, the Los Angeles Chargers signed Hayward to a three-year, $33.25 million contract extension that includes $20 million guaranteed and a signing bonus of $8 million. The contract is worth up to $36 million with incentives and keeps Hayward under contract through the 2021 season.

2019
In week 2 against the Detroit Lions, Hayward recorded his first interception of the season off Matthew Stafford in the 13–10 loss. He recorded his second interception off Mitchell Trubisky in a week 8 17–16 win over Chicago Bears.

2020
In Week 1 against the Cincinnati Bengals, Hayward recorded a team high 12 tackles (12 solo) and two pass deflections during the 16–13 win. He was named the AFC Defensive Player of the Week for his performance in Week 1. In Week 16 against the Denver Broncos, Hayward recorded his first interception of the season off a pass thrown by Drew Lock before exiting the game with a hamstring injury. Without Hayward, the Chargers won the game 19–16.
On January 1, 2021, Hayward was placed on injured reserve. He finished the season with 41 tackles, eight passes defensed and one interception.

On March 13, 2021, Hayward was released by the Chargers.

Las Vegas Raiders

Hayward signed with the Las Vegas Raiders on May 4, 2021.

Atlanta Falcons 
On March 17, 2022, Hayward signed a two-year, $11 million contract with the Atlanta Falcons. He was placed on injured reserve on October 18, 2022 after suffering a shoulder injury in Week 6.

NFL career statistics

Regular season

Postseason

Personal life
Hayward was raised in Perry, Georgia by his parents Casey and Tish Hayward and began playing youth football when he was five years old. His mother Tish died from breast cancer in July 2016.

On November 27, 2017, it was reported that Hayward's younger brother, Jecavesia Hayward, died after a Toyota Camry he was a passenger in crashed into a tractor trailer that was stopped in the emergency lane on Interstate 75. His brother was ejected from the vehicle and hit by passing vehicles. Hayward was allowed to leave the team's facilities and immediately traveled home to be with his family.

Philanthropy
Hayward is involved in many philanthropic endeavors and started his own charity aptly named the Hayward's Hands Foundation. Through the Hayward's Hands Foundation, Hayward donates scholarships to teenagers in his hometown that display hard work and dedication to school, athletics, and to their community. On May 5, 2015, he awarded two $5,000 scholarships to two female students that attend his high school alma mater. Hayward also announced his foundation will continue to award scholarships to students and agreed to pledge $50,000.

References

External links
 Los Angeles Chargers bio
 
 Vanderbilt Commodores bio
 

1989 births
Living people
Players of American football from Georgia (U.S. state)
People from Perry, Georgia
American football cornerbacks
Vanderbilt Commodores football players
Green Bay Packers players
San Diego Chargers players
American Conference Pro Bowl players
Los Angeles Chargers players
Las Vegas Raiders players
Atlanta Falcons players